From China to Taiwan: Pioneers of Abstraction was a group exhibition held at Museum of Ixelles, Brussels, Belgium from 15 June to 24 September 2017. The exhibitions traces the origins and evolution of twentieth-century Chinese abstract painting. Aside from the works, it also explores the careers of those Chinese artists, who were obliged to leave their homeland and seek refuge in Taiwan.

Historical background 

In 1950, the United States protected Taiwan from mainland China and introduced Western culture. Soon, the artists gradually discovered Impressionism and the abstract art of the schools in New York and Paris from the magazines and books in the American Library in Taipei.

In this context of change, new schools of art sprang up. Chu Teh-Chun lectured on art at Taiwan Provincial Normal University between 1951 and 1955, and Lee Chun-Shan taught students in his studio on Antung Street in Taipei from 1950 to 1955. Although they were quite different, both of them had knowledge and great interest in Western art and encouraged their students to develop their own style. Their teaching methods broke away from an ancestral Chinese tradition that advocated copying the masters' works, with little room for individual creativity.

In 1956 and 1957, two important avant-garde Taiwanese movements were formed: the Ton Fan Group, founded by eight of Lee Chun-Shan's pupils and the Fifth Moon Group (also known as Wuyue Group) by followers of Chu Teh-Chun.

Through Abstraction, the artists in Taiwan were able to become part of the international modernist movement, while expressing their deep cultural roots and revitalising 20th-century Chinese painting at the intersection of the East and West.

Exhibited artists 

 The China National Academy of Fine Arts in Hangzhou:
 Chu Teh-Chun
 Lee Chun-Shan
 Zao Wou-Ki
 The Fifth Moon Group or Wuyue Group (1957-1972):
 Chen Ting-Shih
 Chuang Che
 Fong Chun-Ray
 Hu Chi-Chung
 Liu Kuo-Sung
 The Ton Fan Group (1956-1971):
 Chu Wei-Bor
 Ho Kan
 Hsiao Chin
 Hsiao Ming-Hsien
 Lee Shi-Chi 
 Li Yuan-Chia
 Tsai Hsia-Ling
 Richard Lin

Exhibition catalogue 
The exhibition catalogue From China to Taiwan: Pioneers of Abstraction was produced under the research direction of Sabine Vazieux, with the assistance of Huang Chiu-Chen, and published in the collaboration of Museum of Ixelles and Racine, Lannoo Publisher.

Media reportage 

 Luxglove, 5 June 2017.
 Ran Dian, 17 June 2017.
 Rickovia Leung. Exhibition Review: ‘From China to Taiwan: Pioneers of Abstraction (1955–1985)’ at Museum of Ixelles, Brussels, Orientations, Vol. 48-Number 5, Sep/Oct 2017.

References

External links 
Museum of Ixelles, Brussels, Belgium
From China to Taiwan: Pioneers of Abstraction catalogue (English and French Edition)

2017 in Belgium
Art exhibitions in Belgium